Gianfranco Seramondi (born 9 August 1958, in Geneva) is a retired Swiss footballer who played as a defender.

External links
 
 

1958 births
Living people
Swiss men's footballers
Association football defenders
Servette FC players
FC Lausanne-Sport players
CS Chênois players
Footballers from Geneva